West Babylon is a census-designated place (CDP) in the Town of Babylon in Suffolk County, New York, United States. The population was 43,213 at the 2010 census.

Geography
West Babylon is located at  (40.713399, -73.357106).

West Babylon is bordered to the west by Lindenhurst and North Lindenhurst, to the northwest by East Farmingdale, to the north by Wyandanch, to the northeast by Deer Park, to the east by North Babylon and the Village of Babylon, and to the south by the Great South Bay.

The peninsula in the southwest of the CDP is known as Venetian Shores. Served by the Lindenhurst Post Office and School District, this area is almost always considered a part of Lindenhurst.

Demographics

Demographics of the CDP 
As of the census of 2010, there were 43,213 people and 14,537 households in the CDP, with 2.93 persons per household. The population density was 5,540.1 people per square mile (2,149.9/km2).

The racial makeup of the CDP was 79.9% White, 11.2% African American, 0.2% Native American, 2.7% Asian, 0.05% Pacific Islander, 3.6% some other race, and 2.3% from two or more races. Hispanic or Latino of any race were 12.2% of the population. The CDP was 72.5% non-Hispanic White.

There were 14,537 households, out of which 36.7% had children under the age of 18 living with them, 54.3% were headed by married couples living together, 13.4% had a female householder with no husband present, and 27.3% were non-families. 22.0% of all households were made up of individuals, and 10.0% were someone living alone who was 65 years of age or older. The average household size was 2.93, and the average family size was 3.43.

In the CDP, the population was spread out, with 22.5% under the age of 18, 8.8% from 18 to 24, 26.7% from 25 to 44, 27.9% from 45 to 64, and 14.2% who were 65 years of age or older. The median age was 40.0 years.

For the period 2009–2011, it was estimated that there were 14,322 housing units, of which 17.6% were in multi-unit structures. The homeownership rate was 78.7%. The median value of owner-occupied housing units was $353,500. 3.3% of housing units were vacant, and 21.3% of occupied housing units were occupied by renters.

94.6% of the population had lived in the same house 1 year & over. 12.9% of the entire population were foreign born, and 19.9% of residents at least 5 years old spoke a language other than English at home. 87.9% of residents at least 25 years old had graduated high school, and 20.5% of residents at least 25 years old had a bachelor's degree or higher.

The mean travel time to work for workers aged 16 and over was 28.8 minutes. The median income for a household in the CDP was $103,248. The per capita income for the CDP was $30,890. 4.0% of the population were living below the poverty line.

Public schools

The West Babylon Union Free School District serves about half of the CDP of West Babylon and parts of Babylon Village and Wyandanch.

The Venetian Shores neighborhood of West Babylon is in the Lindenhurst Union Free School District. Since this area is also served by the Lindenhurst Post Office, it  is commonly viewed as part of Lindenhurst.

The area around Sawyer Avenue Park is within the Babylon Union Free School District.

East of Belmont Avenue (from Sunrise Highway to Montgomery Avenue), north of Montgomery Avenue (from Belmont Avenue to Little East Neck Road), east of Little East Neck Road (from Montgomery Avenue to Straight Path), and southeast of an imaginary line that stretches from the Straight Path/Little East Neck Road intersection to the Wyandanch Avenue/Belmont avenue intersection, is within the North Babylon Union Free School District.

An area of Wyandanch that is served by the West Babylon Post Office is thought of as a part of West Babylon in the Wyandanch Union Free School District, and there is also a small portion of West Babylon served by the Wyandanch Union Free School District (around Cumberbach Street), but is also served by the Wyandanch post Office.

Main School, when it was built, was the only school in the town serving grades K-10 (older students were sent to Babylon High School). It has been said that the famed poet and writer Walt Whitman was a temporary teacher there. However, since he died in 1892, it would have been before the school district was formed, and he clearly could not have taught at Main School. By the mid-1950s, the building had been expanded, becoming an elementary school. It was demolished in June 1982. Robert Moses participated in the cornerstone-laying ceremony of Santapogue Elementary School, in the fall of 1951. The school opened in September 1952, relieving the overcrowded situation at Main School.

As of the 2010-2011 school year, the West Babylon Union Free School District had 4,360 students. The racial demographics were 0% Native American or Alaska Native, 7% non-Hispanic black or African-American, 13% Hispanic or Latino, 76% non-Hispanic white, 4% Asian or Native Hawaiian/Other Pacific Islander and 0% multiracial. 17% of students were eligible for free lunch, 8% for reduced-price lunch, and 3% of students were Limited English Proficient. 11.8% of students were classified as "Special Ed".

The school district had a graduation rate of 90%, and 1% of students did not complete school. 93% of graduates received a Regents Diploma and 50% received a Regents Diploma with Advanced Designation. Of the 2011 completers, 47% planned to move on to 4-year College, 39% to 2-year College, 1% to Other Post-Secondary, 2% to the Military, 8% to Employment, 0% to Adult Services, 1% had other known post-secondary plans, and 2% had no known post-secondary plan.

The district currently has: 
Five elementary schools (grades K-5): Forest Avenue, John F. Kennedy, Santapogue, South Bay, and Tooker Avenue
One middle school (grades 6-8): West Babylon Junior High School
One high school (Grades 9-12): West Babylon High School

For the 2011-2012 school year, the Accountability Status for all seven schools in the district and the district as a whole was "In Good Standing".

Notable people
 Jovan Belcher, former linebacker for the Kansas City Chiefs
 Dan Deacon, electronic musician
 Harold Dieterle, winner of Bravo's Top Chef (Season 1)
Owen H. Johnson, former member of the New York State Senate
 Billy Koch, former Major League Baseball pitcher for the Toronto Blue Jays among other teams 
 Geraldo Rivera, Fox News reporter and host of Geraldo at Large; graduated from West Babylon High School in 1961
 Kevin Russo, former player for the New York Yankees

Use in media 

 West Babylon is referenced in the book Along Came a Spider by James Patterson in chapter 39 while discussing the hometown of the antagonist's step-mother.

References

External link

Babylon (town), New York
Census-designated places in New York (state)
Populated coastal places in New York (state)